The Session...Recorded in London with Great Artists is a double album by Jerry Lee Lewis released on Mercury Records in 1973. It was recorded in London and features Lewis teaming up with British musicians, including Peter Frampton and Albert Lee.

Background
After scoring a dozen country hits since 1968, Lewis returned to the pop charts with "Me and Bobby McGee" in 1971 and "Chantilly Lace" in 1972, and this turn of events, coupled with a revitalized public interest in vintage rock and roll, inspired Mercury to fly Lewis to London to record with a cadre of gifted British and Irish musicians, including Rory Gallagher, Kenney Jones, Albert Lee, Alvin Lee, Peter Frampton, Gary Wright, and Klaus Voormann. The concept was not new; Chuck Berry, Howlin' Wolf, and B.B. King had already done the same thing in the previous decade. The year before, Lewis had joined Chuck Berry and Little Richard as part of a historic rock and roll show at Wembley Stadium, the first concert ever in that arena. Having toiled in obscurity for most of the '60s, Lewis was the most bankable country star in the world by 1973, living the rock and roll lifestyle to the hilt; according to Rick Bragg's authorized biography Jerry Lee Lewis: His Own Story, Jerry Lee was commanding $10,000 per show and had his own plane, first a DC-3, with "room for all manner of hangers-on and amiable drunks and pretty women with no particular place to go," and later a Convair 604.

Lewis's son, Jerry Lee Lewis, Jr., also made the trip and participated as a drummer.

Recording
By all accounts, the sessions were tense. Part of the reason for this may have been the fact that Lewis had rarely ever recorded outside of Tennessee and, feeling out of his comfort zone and surrounded by a bevy of long-haired musicians, he masked his insecurity by ramping up his already considerable bravado. "I seen all these cats standing around," Lewis recalled in the liner notes to the 2006 box set A Half Century of Hits. "Real long hair and everythin’. I turned to Junior and I said, 'Boy, have I made a mistake comin’ over here.'"  His temper, always infamous, was not helped by the booze and pills that sustained him, and although the musicians (who were actually only a few years younger than him, for the most part) were reverential, Lewis's flippant attitude comes across. "So much for that," he says wearily at the conclusion of "Sea Cruise."  "Next?" (this was, in reality, spliced from a stray comment made during the recording of the album; the upcut of ambiance, reverb and clipped voices can be heard in the background.)

Produced by Steve Rowland, the album consists mostly of '50s rock and roll remakes, but does contain a couple interesting contemporary cuts: a foot-stomping version of Creedence Clearwater Revival's "Bad Moon Rising" and the Gordon Lightfoot classic "Early Morning Rain."  The remake of Lewis's old Sun cut "Drinking Wine Spo-Dee-O-Dee" would be the album's hit single, reaching number 20 on the Billboard country chart and peaking at number 41 on the pop chart. Another noteworthy cut, Charlie Rich's "No Headstone on My Grave," would become a concert staple as a sort of anthem for Lewis and his God-fearing, hell-raising persona.

Lewis would later confess that he was impressed by the British musicians and their professionalism, stating in A Half Century of Hits, "I sat down at the piano, put the headphones on and started to record. These kids, there wasn’t any one of them smokin’ pot, takin’ any pills or liquor. They were clean. Real nice, and they were the greatest musicians I ever heard." According to Colin Escott's essay found in the 1995 Mercury compilation Killer Country, "When Jerry Lee returned, he brought his London rhythm section of Tony Cotton, Albert Lee and Chas Hodges with him. They wrote a song about 'Jack Daniels Old No. 7,' a product they considered quintessentially American, and one near and dear to Jerry's heart."  It became the B-side of "No Headstone On My Grave," Lewis's first record in several years to bomb completely.

Reception

The Session would be Lewis's highest pop charting album since 1964's Golden Hits of Jerry Lee Lewis, hitting number 37. It did far better on the country albums chart, rising to number 4. In his Rolling Stone review of the album, Jon Landau conceded that The Session "wasn't a bad idea" and "a great party record" but noted, "the album suffers from a surfeit of hysterical Alvin Lee guitar, extraneous organ accompaniment, and prolonged and aimless riffing and jamming. Good backup or bad, it doesn't seem to matter to Jerry Lee, who plows through everything with nearly the same mixture of nonchalance and enthusiasm. When he shouts 'Play it, son,' I have a feeling he doesn't care which son or how long he plays, just as long as the spotlight returns to where it belongs when the son is finished."  AllMusic gives the album 3 out of 5 stars and contends that the album only lacks when "compared to his early classic rock & roll recordings."

Track listing
Side 1
"Drinking Wine, Spo-Dee O'Dee" (McGhee, Williams)
"Music to the Man"
"Baby What You Want Me to Do" (Jimmy Reed)
"Bad Moon Rising" (John Fogerty)
"Sea Cruise" (Huey "Piano" Smith)
Side 2
"Jukebox" (Colton, Hodges, Lee)
"No Headstone on My Grave" (Charlie Rich)
"Big Boss Man" (Dixon, Smith)
"Pledging My Love" (Robey, Washington)
"Memphis" (Chuck Berry)
Side 3
"Trouble in Mind" (Richard M. Jones)
"Johnny B. Goode" (Chuck Berry)
"High School Confidential" (Jerry Lee Lewis, Ron Hargrave)
"Early Morning Rain" (Gordon Lightfoot)
Side 4
"Whole Lotta Shakin' Going On" (David, Williams)
"Sixty-Minute Man" (Billy Ward, Rose Marks)
"Movin' On Down The Line" (Roy Orbison, Sam Phillips)
"What'd I Say" (Ray Charles)
"Rock & Roll Medley: "Good Golly Miss Molly" (Marascalo, Blackwell)/"Long Tall Sally" (Johnson, Blackwell, Penniman)/"Jenny, Jenny"/"Tutti Frutti" (Penniman, LaBostrie)/"Whole Lotta Shakin' Going On" (David, Williams)

Charts

Personnel
Jerry Lee Lewis - vocals, piano
Albert Lee, Alvin Lee, Chas Hodges, Joe Jammer, Mick Jones, Peter Frampton, Rory Gallagher - guitar
Drew Croon, Gary Taylor, Kenny Lovelace, Raymond Barry Smith - acoustic guitar
Delaney Bramlett, Rory Gallagher - bottleneck guitar
B.J. Cole - pedal steel
Kenny Lovelace - violin
Chas Hodges, John Gustafson, Klaus Voormann - bass
Andy Bown, J. Peter Robinson - electric piano
Andy Bown, Gary Wright, Matthew Fisher, Tony Ashton - organ
Kenney Jones, Mike Kellie, Pete Gavin - drums
Brian Parrish, Gary Taylor, Jerry Lee Lewis, Jr., Matthew Fisher, Mike Kellie, Pete Gavin, Raymond Barry Smith, Steve Rowland, Tony Ashton, Tony Colton - percussion
Brian Parrish - harmonica
Casey Synge, Dari Lalou, Keren Friedman, Thunderthighs - backing vocals
Technical
Charles Fach - executive producer
Martin Rushent - engineer

References

1973 albums
Jerry Lee Lewis albums
Albums produced by Steve Rowland (record producer)
Mercury Records albums